Chinese hat may refer to:

 Asian conical hat
 Any hat worn as part of Chinese clothing
 Headwear worn throughout Imperial Chinese history
 Calyptraea chinensis, also known as the Chinese hat snail
 Holmskioldia sanguinea, also known as the Chinese hat plant